The men's freestyle lightweight competition at the 1936 Summer Olympics in Berlin took place from 2 August to 4 August at the Deutschlandhalle. Nations were limited to one competitor. This weight class was limited to wrestlers weighing up to 66kg.

This freestyle wrestling competition continued to use the "bad points" elimination system introduced at the 1928 Summer Olympics for Greco-Roman and at the 1932 Summer Olympics for freestyle wrestling, with a slight modification. Each round featured all wrestlers pairing off and wrestling one bout (with one wrestler having a bye if there were an odd number). The loser received 3 points if the loss was by fall or unanimous decision and 2 points if the decision was 2-1 (this was the modification from prior years, where all losses were 3 points). The winner received 1 point if the win was by decision and 0 points if the win was by fall. At the end of each round, any wrestler with at least 5 points was eliminated.

Schedule

Results

Round 1

The four wrestlers who won by fall and the one with the bye took the lead, with 0 bad points. The four other winners by decision each received 1 point. Soğanli lost by split decision and had 2 points; all of the other losers were defeated by either fall or unanimous decision, so each received 3 points.

 Bouts

 Points

Round 2

No wrestlers managed to get through the second round with 0 points; of the five who started with that score, two won by decision and three lost. At the end of the round, five men had 1 point, one had 2 points, and six had 3 points. The five wrestlers who lost in both the first two rounds were eliminated.

 Bouts

 Points

Round 3

Ehrl and Pihlajamäki maintained their 1-point scores with wins by fall. Kárpáti also won again, by decision to receive his second point. Two men finished with 3 points, and three more with 4 points. Four wrestlers were eliminated with their second losses in this round.

 Bouts

 Points

Round 4

Four wrestlers were eliminated in this round, but it was not simply the four losers. Pihlajamäki survived his loss with only 4 points, staying in competition. Kazama, by contrast, was eliminated despite winning, as the win by decision took him from 4 points to 5. Of the four remaining wrestlers, none had fewer than 2 points after the round. The official report ranks Strong 5th and Romagnoli 6th, but Sports-Reference gives Kazama 5th and Strong 6th which is more consistent with the scoring system.

 Bouts

 Points

Round 5

Delporte was the only man eliminated in this round, as Ehrl's loss by split decision moved him only from 2 points to 4. Kárpáti picked up a third point for that bout. Pihlajamäki, starting at 4 points and needing a win by fall to stay in contention, won by fall. This left three men to contest the medals. Kárpáti had already defeated both Pihlajamäki and Ehrl, so could not face them again, making Pihlajamäki against Ehrl the only remaining possible bout. Because Kárpáti had a lower point total than either of the men who would face each other in the next round, Kárpáti secured the gold medal in this round.

 Bouts

 Points

Round 6

With all but three wrestlers eliminated, Kárpáti guaranteed gold, and Pihlajamäki and Ehrl going into the round tied on points, the sixth round was a straight-up silver/bronze medal match. Ehrl won by fall to take the silver medal.

 Bouts

 Points

References

Wrestling at the 1936 Summer Olympics